is a passenger railway station located in the city of Mobara, Chiba Prefecture Japan, operated by the East Japan Railway Company (JR East).

Lines
Limited express Wakashio services from Tokyo to  stop at this station.

Station layout
The station consists of two elevated island platforms serving four tracks, with the station building underneath. The station has a Midori no Madoguchi staffed ticket office.

Platforms

History
It was absorbed into the Japanese Government Railways on 1 September 1907. It was renamed to its present name on 10 July 1935. It joined the JR East network upon the privatization of the Japanese National Railways (JNR) on 1 April 1987.

Passenger statistics
In fiscal 2019, the station was used by an average of 10,901 passengers daily (boarding passengers only).

Surrounding area
 
 Chosei Municipal HospitalMobara City Hall

See also
 List of railway stations in Japan

References

External links

 JR East Station information 

Railway stations in Japan opened in 1897
Railway stations in Chiba Prefecture
Sotobō Line
Stations of East Japan Railway Company
Mobara